Acontia chea is a species of bird dropping moth in the family Noctuidae. It is found in North America.

The MONA or Hodges number for Acontia chea is 9160.

References

Further reading

 
 
 
 

chea
Articles created by Qbugbot
Moths described in 1889